Belmont-d'Azergues (literally Belmont of Azergues) is a commune of the Rhône department in eastern France.

See also
 Communes of the Rhône department

References

Communes of Rhône (department)